Changal may refer to:
Changal, Iran
Changal, Tajikistan